Mary Waltman is an American actress who is the voice of the character Lemon Meringue in the series Strawberry Shortcake (remade in 2003).  In 2006 she debuted in the movie Strawberry Shortcake: The Sweet Dreams Movie as Lemon Meringue.  In 2007 she was in Berry Blossom Festival and Let's Dance, also as Lemon Meringue.  In 2008 she was in Big Country Fun, also as Lemon Meringue.  She has also done some voice work for the series Horseland.  She currently resides in Los Angeles, California. Waltman currently attends the University of Alabama as a musical theatre major.

References

American voice actresses
Living people
Year of birth missing (living people)